Premuda is a small island in Croatia, off the northern Adriatic coast. It belongs to the north Dalmatian islands which are situated north-west from the county center Zadar. It is situated southwest of Silba and northwest of Škarda and is the last island before the Italian coastline.

Premuda was first mentioned in historical sources by Tabula Peutingeriana, as Pamodos. In the 7th century, the island is mentioned as Primodia, derived from Latin primus ("the first"), indicating its geographical position as the first island in the Zadar Channel seen from the northwest. In 16th and 17th centuries Premuda was targeted by Ottoman corsairs who took the islanders away as slaves. This reduced the island's population to just 26 in 1608. In the 18th century, the island recovered through immigration, mostly from Olib, and by 1760 the population grew to 322.

Natural water resources on Premuda are scarce, which has historically been a limiting factor in the island's development. The island's population peaked at 577 inhabitants in 1857, and has steadily declined since, particularly in the second half of the 20th century, when many islanders moved to Zadar and Rijeka, and also to North and South America.

Electricity was introduced to Premuda in 1971. The elementary school, opened in 1867, was closed in 1991. The island's telephone network was built in 1998.

The only settlement on the island, the town of Premuda, has about 60 inhabitants but the population strongly varies during the summer season. The population of Premuda is cultivating olives and breeding sheep and in the last few years they have become involved in tourism. There are three restaurants on the island.

Premuda is a destination for nautical and diving tourists, and has a number of diving spots. The "Katedrala" is a system of connected caves with light rays that fall through the porous ceiling of the caves.

References

Bibliography

External links

Premuda photos
Diving information

Islands of Croatia
Islands of the Adriatic Sea
Landforms of Zadar County